Edward John Gehl (January 26, 1890 – August 28, 1956) was an American jurist from Wisconsin.

Born in Hartford, Wisconsin, Gehl graduated from the University of Wisconsin Law School in 1913. During World War I, he served in the United States Army and was awarded the Purple Heart and Silver Star. Gehl was in private practice in Hartford and then was elected a Wisconsin Circuit Court judge. In 1949, Gehl was elected to the Wisconsin Supreme Court serving until his death. He died at a hospital in Madison, Wisconsin following surgery.

Notes

People from Hartford, Wisconsin
University of Wisconsin Law School alumni
Wisconsin state court judges
Justices of the Wisconsin Supreme Court
1890 births
1956 deaths
20th-century American judges